Magnenat is a surname. Notable people with the surname include:

Gabrielle Gachet, née Gabrielle Magnenat (born 1980), Swiss ski mountaineer
Nadia Magnenat Thalmann, Swiss-Canadian computer graphics scientist and robotician
Roland Magnenat (born 1922), Swiss weightlifter
Sergio Trujillo Magnenat (1911–1999), Colombian painter, illustrator and sculptor